Seppo Suutari (born 28 December 1940) is a Finnish athlete. He competed in the men's decathlon at the 1960 Summer Olympics.

References

External links
 

1940 births
Living people
Athletes (track and field) at the 1960 Summer Olympics
Finnish decathletes
Olympic athletes of Finland
People from Kauhajoki
Sportspeople from South Ostrobothnia